Stefanie Jodl (born August 4, 1998) is a German volksmusik singer.

Career 
At the age of 10, in 2008, she released her first single, titled "Warum soll denn ein Mädchen kein Lausbub nicht sein". That year the song won the first place in the yearly Swiss Volksmuzik Hit Parade compiled by a Swiss internet portal dedicated to volksmusik.

In 2009, she released her first maxi single, titled "Mei beste Freundin".

Later that year she won at the Weißblauer Stammtisch festival, held in Töging am Inn by Radio ISW.

On January 8, 2011, she performed at ARD's volksmusik program . That was her biggest audience to date, the TV show is watched by every tenth German.

In the summer of 2011, she released her first album Megapowermadl, which contained 14 songs. The album was recorded in one day.

At the Traunreut Autumn Festival in October 2011, she won the 's Weißblaue Hitparade. She won at the Hit Parade again in 2012.

In July 2012, she performed at the Rüßwihler Dorffest.

Style 
Stefanie Jodl sings in Bavarian and plays violin. Her role model is Stefanie Hertel. She can also play piano.

Personal 
In February 2017, she made her debut at the Vienna Opera Ball.

Discography

Albums

Maxi singles

Singles

References 

 
 
 
 
 >

External links 
 

1998 births
Schlager musicians
Living people
21st-century German women singers